Orange City may refer to:

 Orange City, Florida, United States
 Orange City, Iowa, United States
 City of Orange, New Jersey, United States
 Nagpur, Maharashtra, India, nicknamed "Orange City"
 Bhawani Mandi, Rajasthan, India, nicknamed "Orange City"
 Hiwarkhed (Orange City), Amravati District, Maharashtra, India
 Warud, Maharashtra, India, nicknamed "Orange City"

See also
 Oranjestad (disambiguation)